A total solar eclipse occurred on May 19, 1928. A solar eclipse occurs when the Moon passes between Earth and the Sun, thereby totally or partly obscuring the image of the Sun for a viewer on Earth. A total solar eclipse occurs when the Moon's apparent diameter is larger than the Sun's, blocking all direct sunlight, turning day into darkness. Totality occurs in a narrow path across Earth's surface, with the partial solar eclipse visible over a surrounding region thousands of kilometres wide.

While it was a total solar eclipse, it was a non-central total eclipse.

This was the last of 56 umbral solar eclipses of Solar Saros 117. The 1st was in 936 AD and the 56th was in 1928. The total duration is 992 years.

Related eclipses

Solar eclipses 1928–1931

Metonic series

Notes

References

1928 05 19
1928 in science
1928 05 19
May 1928 events